Jaan Murro (born 21 June 1903 in Alu – 28 August 1969) was an Estonian politician. He was a member of VI Riigikogu (its Chamber of Deputies).

References

1903 births
1969 deaths
Members of the Riigivolikogu
Burials at Pärnamäe Cemetery
People from Pärnu